Abeadzi Kyiakor, a Fante town, is a village  near Saltpond, in Mfantseman Municipal district, in the Central Region of Ghana.

References

Populated places in the Central Region (Ghana)